Year 138 (CXXXVIII) was a common year starting on Tuesday (link will display the full calendar) of the Julian calendar. At the time, it was known as the Year of the Consulship of Niger and Camerinus (or, less frequently, year 891 Ab urbe condita). The denomination 138 for this year has been used since the early medieval period, when the Anno Domini calendar era became the prevalent method in Europe for naming years.

Events 
<onlyinclude>

By place

Roman Empire 
 February 25 – Emperor Hadrian makes Antoninus Pius his successor, on condition that he adopt Marcus Aurelius and Lucius Verus. 
 July 10 – Hadrian dies after a heart failure at Baiae, and is buried at Rome in the Gardens of Domitia beside his wife, Vibia Sabina.
 Antoninus Pius succeeds Hadrian as Roman Emperor, and asks the Senate to confer divine honors for Hadrian.
 Construction begins on the Theater of Philadelphia (Amman).
 Hadrian's Villa, Tivoli, Italy, is finished.

By topic

Commerce 
 The silver content of the Roman denarius falls to 75 percent under Emperor Antoninus Pius, down from 87 percent under Hadrian.

Births 
 Han Zhidi, Chinese emperor of the Han Dynasty (d. 146)
 Marcus Ummidius Quadratus, Roman politician (d. 182)

Deaths 
 January 1 – Lucius Aelius Caesar, Roman politician and adopted son of Hadrian (b. 101)
 July 10 – Hadrian, Roman emperor (b. AD 76)
 Zenobius, Greek sophist and writer (b. 117)

References 

138